Paul Kasey (born 5 August 1973) is an English actor who frequently plays monsters on Doctor Who, The Sarah Jane Adventures and Torchwood.

Kasey was born in Chatham, Kent. He has played the Cybercontroller, the Cyber Leader, Cybermen, a clockwork android, the Hoix, an Auton, a Slitheen, an Ood, the Anne-Droid and a member of the Forest of Cheem in Doctor Who, and Janet the Weevil, Alien Blowfish and a Hoix in Torchwood.

He has also made many appearances in The Sarah Jane Adventures as aliens, and frequent appearances as himself on Totally Doctor Who, usually in costume.
Kasey has also appeared as a zombie in 28 Days Later and has appeared in the Star Wars film series as Ello Asty in The Force Awakens, Admiral Raddus and Edrio Two Tubes in Rogue One, and C'ai Threnalli in The Last Jedi.

Filmography

Doctor Who

Torchwood

The Sarah Jane Adventures

Other

References

External links

1973 births
Living people
Male actors from Kent
People from Chatham, Kent